Michael Joseph Alstott (born December 21, 1973), is an American former professional football player who was a fullback in the National Football League (NFL) for 12 seasons with the Tampa Bay Buccaneers. Nicknamed "A-Train", he played college football at Purdue and was selected by the Buccaneers in the second round of the 1996 NFL Draft. Alstott received six Pro Bowl and three first-team All-Pro honors during his career, in addition to being part of the Buccaneers team that won the franchise's first Super Bowl title in Super Bowl XXXVII. For his accomplishments in Tampa Bay, he was inducted to the Buccaneers Ring of Honor in 2015. He is widely regarded as one of the greatest fullbacks of all time.

College career
Alstott attended Purdue University for four years, where he became the first player in school history named MVP in three consecutive seasons. Alstott scored 12 touchdowns as a sophomore, 14 as a junior, and 11 as a senior, and held the Purdue rushing touchdown record with 39 until Kory Sheets broke it in 2008. He averaged 5.6 yards per attempt during his Purdue career before graduating in 1995 with a bachelor's degree in business. He finished as Purdue's all-time leading rusher with 3,635 yards, including a school-best 1,436 yards in 1995.

Professional career

Alstott was selected in the second round (35th overall) by the Tampa Bay Buccaneers. The Buccaneers utilized Alstott primarily as a running fullback as opposed to a blocking fullback that teams were starting to switch to at the time. He was a member of the Tampa Bay Buccaneers team that won Super Bowl XXXVII (2002), played at Qualcomm Stadium in San Diego, California. Alstott rushed for 15 yards and the first Super Bowl touchdown in Tampa Bay Buccaneers history. He also caught five passes for 43 yards.

Alstott signed a one-year contract to stay in Tampa Bay for the 2005 season, and signed a similar contract at the conclusion of the 2006 season after contemplating retirement. However, he spent all of the 2007 season on injured reserve because of neck problems, leading to his retirement on January 24, 2008.

In the summer of 2007, shortly before he suffered his season-ending and ultimately career-ending neck injury, Alstott appeared in a television commercial for ESPN Fantasy Football along with former teammate Warrick Dunn, who was later signed by the Falcons.

He was ranked No. 10 on the NFL Network's "Top Ten Power Backs".

With 71 total touchdowns as a Buccaneer, Alstott broke the previous franchise record of 46 by running back James Wilder when he scored his 47th career TD on November 26, 2001. Alstott remained the Buccaneers' all-time leading touchdown scorer until November 22, 2021, when wide receiver Mike Evans scored his 72nd TD as a Buccaneer.

NFL career statistics
Rushing statistics

Receiving statistics

Personal life
Alstott and his ex-wife, Nicole Alstott, have three children. His son Griffin was the back-up quarterback at Western Michigan University after spending the 2017 season at Purdue.

References

External links

 

1973 births
Living people
American football fullbacks
National Conference Pro Bowl players
Players of American football from Illinois
Purdue Boilermakers football players
Sportspeople from Joliet, Illinois
Tampa Bay Buccaneers players
Ed Block Courage Award recipients